Barbara Janet Fontaine (born 29 December 1953) is a British judge and solicitor. She has served as Senior Master of the King's Bench Division and King's Remembrancer since 2014: she is the first woman and first solicitor to hold this ancient post. She was an articled clerk at Bird & Bird from 1976 to 1978, and then worked as a solicitor at Hill Dickinson, Coward Chance and Baker McKenzie.

References

1953 births
Living people
Masters of the High Court (England and Wales)
British solicitors
British women lawyers